Agard is a surname. Notable people with the surname include:

 David Agard, American biochemist
 Ernesto Agard (born 1937), Panamanian basketball player
 John Agard (born 1949), playwright, poet and children's writer from Guyana
 Kieran Agard (born 1989), English footballer
 Nadema Agard (born 1948), American artist

See also
 AGARD, NATO's Advisory Group for Aeronautical Research and Development, now renamed NATO Research and Technology Organisation
 Agárd, a small village in Hungary
 Arthur Agarde, a British antiquary
 Aagaard, a surname